Jason Aldean is the debut studio album by American country music artist Jason Aldean. It was released on July 26, 2005 via Broken Bow Records. The album produced three singles on the U.S. Billboard Hot Country Songs charts: "Hicktown" (No. 10), "Why" (No. 1), and "Amarillo Sky" (No. 4). The album has been certified platinum by the RIAA.

Several of this album's tracks were recorded by other artists, including two of the singles: "Amarillo Sky" previously served as the title track to McBride & the Ride's 2002 album of the same name and "Why" was also recorded by Shannon Brown on her 2005 album Corn Fed. In addition, "Good to Go" was recorded by John Corbett on his self-titled debut album, from which it was released as a single. Furthermore, "Asphalt Cowboy" was previously recorded by Blake Shelton on his 2003 album The Dreamer.

Track listing

Personnel
Jason Aldean – lead vocals
Kurt Allison – electric guitar
Smith Curry – steel guitar, lap steel guitar
Tony Harrell – keyboards
Wes Hightower – background vocals
Mike Johnson – steel guitar
Tully Kennedy – bass guitar
Steven King – keyboards
Liana Manis – background vocals
Gene Miller – background vocals
Jason Mowery – fiddle, mandolin
Mike Noble – acoustic guitar
Rich Redmond – drums, percussion
Adam Shoenfeld – acoustic guitar, electric guitar
Jack Sizemore – electric guitar

Chart performance
The album has sold 1.6 million copies in the US as of January 2015.

Weekly charts

Year-end charts

Singles

Certifications

References

External links
[ Jason Aldean] at Allmusic

2005 debut albums
Jason Aldean albums
BBR Music Group albums
Albums produced by Michael Knox (record producer)